Sri Parthasarathy Temple is a Hindu temple located in Mundakkayam town in Kanjirappally taluk of Kottayam district in the Indian state of Kerala. It is situated on the road to Kuttikkanam, about 52 km from Kottayam and 20 km from Kuttikkanam.

Deity 
Lord Parthasarathy (Krishna as the charioteer of Arjuna) is the principal deity here, accompanied by sub deities like Ganapathi, Ayyappa, Nagaraja and Yakshi.

Ritual 
Three poojas are held daily. The morning section starts with 'Ushspooja'. The noon section includes 'Uchapooja. 'Athazhapooja' concludes the desk section.

Festival 
The annual festival is hosted in the Malayalam month of Makaram (i.e. January/February) lasting 6 days. The festivities are commenced by ceremonial flag hosting or Kodiyettam on the first day.

References 

Hindu temples in Kottayam district